Hydriomena nubilofasciata, the oak winter highflier, is a species of geometrid moth in the family Geometridae. It is found in North America. The adults reach a wingspan of 24-30 mm and appear around oaks in late January and February. 

The MONA or Hodges number for Hydriomena nubilofasciata is 7276.

References

Further reading

External links

 

Hydriomena
Articles created by Qbugbot
Moths described in 1871